Philosophy and the Mirror of Nature is a 1979 book by the American philosopher Richard Rorty, in which the author attempts to dissolve modern philosophical problems instead of solving them by presenting them as pseudo-problems that only exist in the language-game of epistemological projects culminating in analytic philosophy. In a pragmatist gesture, Rorty suggests that philosophy must get past these pseudo-problems if it is to be productive. The work was considered controversial upon publication, and had its greatest success outside analytic philosophy.

Background
The main influences on Rorty's work were John Dewey, Ludwig Wittgenstein, Willard Van Orman Quine, and Wilfrid Sellars.

Summary
Rorty argues that philosophy has unduly relied on a representational theory of perception and a correspondence theory of truth, hoping our experience or language might mirror the way reality actually is. In this he continues a certain controversial Anglophone tradition, which builds upon the work of philosophers such as Quine, Sellars, and Donald Davidson. Rorty opts out of the traditional objective/subjective dialogue in favor of a communal version of truth. For him, "true" is simply an honorific knowers bestow on claims, asserting them as what "we" want to say about a particular matter.

Rorty explains how philosophical paradigm shifts and their associated philosophical "problems" can be considered the result of the new metaphors, vocabularies, and mistaken linguistic associations which are necessarily a part of those new paradigms.

Reception
Philosophy and the Mirror of Nature was seen to be somewhat controversial upon its publication. It had its greatest success outside analytic philosophy, despite its reliance on arguments by Quine and Sellars, and was widely influential in the humanities. It was criticized extensively by analytic philosophers.

See also
 Direct and indirect realism
 Neopragmatism

Notes and references

External links
Princeton University Press - Philosophy and the Mirror of Nature
LibraryThing - Philosophy and the Mirror of Nature

1979 non-fiction books
American non-fiction books
Books by Richard Rorty
Cognitive science literature
English-language books
Princeton University Press books